Benedek Broadcasting was a television broadcasting company, who owned and operated 22 network-affiliated television stations throughout the United States, all affiliated with major television networks, serving mainly small and medium-size markets. The company was founded in the late 1970s by A. Richard Benedek but grew in the 1990s with buyouts of Brisette Broadcasting and Stauffer Communications. The company was based in Hoffman Estates, Illinois.  Throughout its existence, namesake Benedek served as chairman and chief executive officer.

Benedek also owned U.S. Virgin Islands station WBNB-TV starting in 1986, but was knocked off the air by Hurricane Hugo in 1989. Its facilities were so badly damaged that Benedek, with no financial resources to rebuild,  essentially chose to abandon the station, and its license was deleted in 1995.

Benedek Broadcasting filed for bankruptcy in 2002, and sold off its 22 stations to different owners, many of them to Gray Television with the balance (all small or struggling stations) going to Chelsey Broadcasting. Barrington Broadcasting which began operations in 2004 with former Benedek president and COO K. James Yager as CEO, occupied what had been Benedek's headquarters and purchased two of the former Benedek stations which had been purchased by Chelsey, until it was acquired by Sinclair Broadcast Group in 2013. 

Benedek Broadcasting had also operated Benedek Interactive Media, an 'Internet newsroom' that extended web-only coverage and editorial capabilities to its stations.

List of stations formerly owned by Benedek
Stations are arranged alphabetically by state and by city of license.

Defunct television broadcasting companies of the United States
Defunct companies based in Illinois
Companies disestablished in 2002
Companies based in Cook County, Illinois
Hoffman Estates, Illinois
2002 disestablishments in Illinois
Gray Television